Vani Viswanath (born 13 May 1971) is an Indian actress who predominantly appeared in Malayalam and Telugu films. In 2000, Vani won the Kerala State Film Award for Second Best Actress for her performance in Susanna, directed by T. V. Chandran. She was termed as Mollywood's "Action Queen". In 2017, she joined in Telugu Desam Party in Andhra Pradesh.

Early life
Vani was born as the fourth among the five children of Malayali parents Thazhathuveettil Vishwanathan, an astrologer and Girija, a housewife in Ollur, Thrissur in 1971. She did her schooling at St. Raphael's Convent Girls High School, Ollur and thereafter at Chennai. When she was 13, her father predicted through astrology that she will become an actor and also she will enter into the politics.

Career
She has appeared predominantly in Malayalam and Telugu movies. She acted in The King with Mammootty and in Usthad with Mohanlal and in Chinthamani Kolacase with Suresh Gopi respectively. She also appeared in Kannada and Tamil movies. She was among the big stars of her time in the South India. Her Tollywood movie Gharana Mogudu with Tollywood superstar, Chiranjeevi was a huge hit.  Vani also acted in two Hindi film with Superstar Mithun Chakraborty in Jung and Bhishma.

Personal life
While acting for several films with Baburaj, she fell in love with him. The couple got married in 2002 and have two children.

Awards
Kerala State Film Awards
 2000 - Second Best Actress - Susanna

Filmography

Malayalam

 Mangalya Charthu (1987) as Sithara (Debut Film)
 Evidence (1988) as Dahlia
 Aadyaraathrikku Munpu (1992) 
 Sipayi Lahala (1995) as Radhika 
 Mannar Mathai Speaking (1995) as Meera Varma /Stella Fernandez
 Mangalam Veettil Manaseswari Gupta (1995) as Maya Surendran/ Manaseswari Gupta
 The King (1995) as Anuradha Mukharji
 Thakshashila (1995) as Amalendu
 Swarnakireedam (1996) as Sindhu
 Man of the Match (1996) as Sonia
 Mandrika Kuthira (1996) as Ancy Sunny
 Kaliveedu (1996) as Yamini Menon
 Hitler (1996) as Ammu
 The Good Boys (1997) as Guest Role
 Poothumbiyum Poovalanmarum (1997) as Nanditha
 Kilukil Pambaram (1997) as Sugandhi
 Kannur (1997) as Annie Rozario
 Janathipathyam (1997) as Maya Pillai
 Anubhoothi (1997) as Radha
 Ilamura Thamburan (1998) as Urmila
 Harthal (1998) as Mekhamala S Thampy
 Dravidan (1998) as Jiji Philipose
 Panchaloham (1998) as Jagadha
 The Truth (1998) as SP Meena Nambiar IPS
 Vasanthiyum Lakshmiyum Pinne Njaanum (1999) as Jayanthi
 Ustaad (1999) as Police Commissioner Varsha
 The Godman (1999) as Adv. Aswathy Menon
 Thachiledathu Chundan (1999) as Ambika
 James Bond (1999 film) (1999) as Dayana IPS Officer
 Captain (1999) as Renuka Varma
 Independence (1999) as Indu
 Garshom (1999) as Sushama
 The Gang (2000) as Kathy Saimon
 India Gate (2000) as Parvathi Sharma
 Rapid Action Force (2000) as Adithya Varma IPs
 Ival Draupathi (2000) as Ajitha Madhavan
 Daivathinte Makan (2000)
 Indriyam (2000) as Neeli
 Susanna (2000) as Susanna 
 Ee Nadu Innalevare (2001) as Beena Benjamin IPS
 Nagaravadhu (2001) as Sukanya
 India Gate (2002) as IPS Officer
 Puthooramputhri Unniyarcha (2002) as Unniyarcha
 Ente Hridhayathinte Udama (2002) as Uma
 Ee Bhargavee Nilayam (2002) as Bhargavi
 Akhila (2002) as Akhila
 Bheri (2002) as Vasudha Nedungadi
 Danny (2002) as Margarette
 Balram Vs Tharadas (2006) as MLA Rani
 Chinthamani Kolacase (2006) as Adv.Pattammal
 Twenty:20 (2008) as Archive footage only
 Black Dalia (2009) as IPS Officer Daisy Wilfred
 Manushyamrugam (2011) {N/A} - Producer only
 Uppukandam Brothers Back In Action (2011) as Kochamini
 Mannar Mathai Speaking 2 (2014) as Lakshmi (Cameo)
 The Criminal Lawyer - TBA

Telugu

 Chinni Krishnudu (1988)
 Dharma Teja (1989) as Vichya
 Simha Swapnam (1989) as Kavita
 Bhale Dampatulu (1989) as Vani
 Naa Mogudu Naake Sontham (1989) as Sumithra
 Sahasame Naa Oopiri (1989) as Padmini
 Kondaveeti Rowdy  (1990) as Rekha
 Kodama Simham (1990) as Bar servant
 Dagudumuthala Dampathyam (1990) as Rekha
 Mama Alludu (1990) as Jaya
 Maa Inti Katha (1990) as Gouri
 Doctor Bhavani (1990) as Meghamala
 Chinna Kodalu (1991) as Durga
 Rowdyism Nashinchali (1990) as Devi
 Prema Yuddham (1990) as Julie
 Aayudham (1990) as Rangamma
 Neti Dowrjanyam (1990) as Swathi
 Irugillu Porugillu (1991) as  Subbulu
 Parishkaram (1991) as Jyothi
 Sarpayagam (1991) as Chitrangi
 Nenera Police (1991) as Vani
 Collector Gaari Alludu (1992) as Madhuri
 Gharana Mogudu (1992) as Bhavani
 Seetapathi Chalo Tirupathi (1992) as Aliveelu Mangatayaru
 Palleturi Pellam (1992) as Kanakadurga Devi
 Alexander (1992) as Vaani
 Samrat Ashoka (1992) as Tishya Raksha
 Vadinagaari Gajulu (1992) as Janaki
 SP Teja (1992)
 Joker (1993) as Usha Rani
 Ladies Special (1993) as Hema
 Mama Kodalu (1993) as Deepa
 Prema Chitram Pelli Vichitram (1993) as Usha
 Gangmaster (1994) as Swapna
 Raitu Bharatam (1994) as Sita
 Prema & Co. (1994) as Sundari
 Presidentugari Alludu (1994) as Lavanya
 Maro Quit India (1994) as Durga
 Dongala Rajyam (1994) as Vyjayanthi
 Todi Kodallu (1994) as Jyoti
 God Father (1995) as Rani
 Adavilo Arunakka (1998)
 Action No. 1 (2002) as Kiron
 Janam (2002) as Inspector Swapna
 Mudhu (2006)
 Ratnavali (2011) as 
 Jaya Janaki Nayaka (2017) as Narayana's sister
 Orey Bujjiga (2020) as Chamundeswari

Tamil
 Mannukkul Vairam (1986) {Debut film} as Chinnathayee
 Nallavan (1988) as Radha
 Poonthotta Kaavalkaran (1988) as Vidhya
 Thaimel Aanai (1988) as Vijaya
 Ithu Engal Neethi (1988)
 Sanghu Pushpangal (1989) as Rosy
 My India (1997) as Malavika
 Jaya (2002)
 Idhaya Thirudan (2005) as Sudharani
 Anandha Thollai (2012)

Kannada
 Mangalya    (Kannada) (1991) as Lavanya
 Bombay Dada (1991) as Veena
 Ranabheri   (Kannada) (1990) as Rosy
 Sididedda Gandu   (Kannada) (1990) as Anitha
 Parashuram (1989) as Usha

Hindi
 Bhishma (1996) With Mithun Chakraborty as Paro
 Jung (1996)  With Mithun Chakraborty as Laxmi
 Zakhmi Sipahi (1994) With Mithun Chakraborty

Television
Mattoruval (2010) as Annie/Geetha Varma (Surya TV)
Kaatrinile Varum Geetham as Gayathri Devi (Sun TV)
Samudram (2011)
Dear Kairali (2002) - (Surya TV) as Host

References

External links
 
 
 Vani Viswanath at MSI

1968 births
Living people
20th-century Indian actresses
21st-century Indian actresses
Indian film actresses
Actresses in Malayalam cinema
Actresses in Kannada cinema
Actresses in Tamil cinema
Actresses in Telugu cinema
Kerala State Film Award winners
Actresses in Hindi cinema
Actresses from Thrissur
St. Raphael's Convent Girls High School alumni
Telugu Desam Party politicians
Malayali politicians
Indian actor-politicians
Women in Andhra Pradesh politics
Actresses in Malayalam television
Actresses in Tamil television